Relaxin/insulin-like family peptide receptor 2, also known as RXFP2, is a human G-protein coupled receptor.

The receptors for glycoprotein hormones such as follicle-stimulating hormone (FSH; see MIM 136530) and thyroid-stimulating hormone (TSH; see MIM 188540) are G protein-coupled, 7-transmembrane receptors (GPCRs) with large N-terminal extracellular domains. Leucine-rich repeat (LRR)-containing GPCRs (LGRs) form a subgroup of the GPCR superfamily. [supplied by OMIM].

See also
 Relaxin receptor

References

Further reading

External links

G protein-coupled receptors